Karen Alkalay-Gut (born 29 March 1945) is a poet, professor, and editor who lives in Israel and writes in English.

Personal life
Born in London on the last night of the Blitz buzz bombs, Alkalay-Gut moved with her parents and brother Joseph Rosenstein to Rochester, New York in 1948.  She graduated from the University of Rochester, with a BA with honors, and an MA in English literature in 1967.  From 1967–70 she taught at the State University of New York at Geneseo before returning to complete her doctorate.  In 1972 she moved to Israel and began teaching at the Ben Gurion University of the Negev (1972–76).  In 1977 she moved to Tel Aviv University,  where she continued to teach. She is married to Ezra Gut and does not number her children and grandchildren because it gives too much information to the evil eye.

Work
In 1980 her first collection, Making Love: Poems appeared with the aid and editorial assistance of poet David Avidan, and she has published over twenty books since. Her poetry has also appeared in Hebrew, French, Arabic, Yiddish, Rumanian, Polish, Russian, German, Turkish, Persian and Italian.
Her concern with multimedia has brought about collaborations with fashion houses such as Comme il faut, as well as sculpture, graffiti, ceremonies.  Her translations of Hebrew poetry such Yehuda Amichai and Rony Sommek have numbered in the hundreds.

As a critic, Alkalay-Gut is the author of a biography of Adelaide Crapsey as well as numerous articles on Victorian and contemporary literature.  She has participated in numerous anthologies, encyclopedias and edited volumes.  She has also translated poetry and drama from Hebrew and other languages, including Yehuda Amichai, Raquel Chalfi, and Hanoch Levin.
In 1980 Alkalay-Gut helped found the Israel Association of Writers in English, and functioned as chair from 1995-2015. She returned to chair in 2018. She also served as vice-chair of the Federation of Writers' Unions, and as an editor of the Jerusalem Review.

Alkalay-Gut has appeared in venues such as the Library of Congress and Kennedy Center in Washington, D.C., the U.N. and the Yale Club of New York City, The Einav Center, Beit Avihai, the Willy Brandt Center, Mishkenot Shaananim and the Writers House in Israel, as well as many universities, churches, synagogues and nightclub around the world.   

In 2019 she was awarded the Leib Rubinlicht award for her contribution to Yiddish Literature.  In 2018 she was listed by the Jewish Agency as number 24 of one hundred Jews who moved from Britain to help shape the modern state of Israel.  Among her previous awards are the Jewish Agency Award in 1994, and first in the BBC World Service Poetry Award (1990).

Works
 Alone in the Dawn: The Life of Adelaide Crapsey. Athens: University of Georgia Press, December 1988.

Poetry 
Books in English
 Making Love: Poems. Tel Aviv: Achshav, 1980
 Mechitza. New York: Cross-Cultural Communications, 1986
 Ignorant Armies. Tel Aviv: Tentative Press, 1992
 Between Bombardments. Tel Aviv: Tentative Press, 1992
 Love Soup. Tel Aviv: Tentative Press, 1992
 High School Girls. Tel Aviv: Tentative Press, 1992
 Recipes. Tel Aviv: Golan, 1994 Harmonies/ Disharmonies. Etc. Editions, 1994
 Ignorant Armies. New York: Cross Cultural Communications, 1994
 Life in Israel—November 1995–1996. Whistle Press, 1997.
 In My Skin, Sivan, 2000.
 High Maintenance, Ride the Wind Press, 2001
 So Far So Good. Boulevard, 2004.
 Danza del ventre a tel aviv. Kololbris, 2010.
 Layers. Simple Conundrums, 2012.
 Avra Cadivra. Amazon, 2013.
 Hanging Around the House. Simple Conundrums, 2017.
 A Word in Edgewise. Simple Conundrums, 2020.
 Inheritance, Leyvick Press, 2021.
 Egypt: An Israelite Returns. Simple Conundrums, 2021.
Books in Hebrew:
 Pislei Chema. Kibbutx Hameuchad. 1983.
 Butter Sculptures (Hebrew). Tel Aviv: Ha kibbutz Hameuchad, 1983. 
 Ata, Ani, veod Shirei Milchama. Kibbutx Hameuchad, 1989.
 HaAltivi Behayei Yomyom.. Gvanim, 1990.
 I/Thou and Other War Poems. Tel Aviv: Hakibbutz Hameuchad,1994
 Paranormal Poems. Gvanim, 1997
 Ahavat Begadim ve Erom. Kibbutz Hameuchad, 1999.
 Ta'avot Shuliot. Kibbutz Hameuchad, 2004.
 Shomrei Neurei. Keshev, 2011.
 Nisim vechulei. Keshev, 2012.
 Drachim le'ehov Keshev, 2018.

Books in Yiddish:
 Yerusha. Beit Leyvick, 2018.

Book in Italian:
 Danza del ventre a Tev Aviv, Kolibris, 2010.

Book in French
 Survivre a son histoire, (translation:  Sabine Huynh)Corlevour, 2020.

Book in Danish
 ' 'Rum & krop: Digte fra Israel (translation:  Flemming Ravn) Ravns Bureau, 2020.
Discography:
 The Paranormal in Our Daily Lives. Poems: Karen Alkalay-Gut; Piano: Liz Magne; Recording, Mix – Ziv Yonatan. 1999.
 Thin Lips – Thin Lips. Poems: Karen Alkalay-Gut; Piano: Roy Yarkoni; Bass: Yishai Sommer. Pookh Records, 2004.
 Panic Ensemble – Love Soup. A DVD release, 2008.
 Panic Ensemble – Jewish Women. Earsay Records, 2008 
 Panic Ensemble – Panic Ensemble, Earsay Records, 2008.
 Panic Ensemble – A Different Story, Nana Disc LTD, 2012.
 Danza del ventre a Tel Aviv [Belly Dancing in Tel Aviv]: Poesie d'amore e sopravivenza [Poems of Love and Survival] [Unabridged] [Audible Audio Edition], Quondom,2012.

See also
 Ada Aharoni
 Raquel Chalfi
 Hava Pinchas-Cohen
 Janice Rebibo
 Naomi Shemer
 Yona Wallach
 Zelda (poet)

References

External links 
 Author's webpage
 /Review of Layers.

1945 births
Living people
University of Rochester alumni
20th-century Sephardi Jews
21st-century Sephardi Jews
English emigrants to Israel
English Jews
English biographers
English literary critics
British women literary critics
Israeli women literary critics
English women poets
Israeli Jews
Israeli editors
Israeli women editors
Israeli literary critics
Academic staff of Tel Aviv University
Israeli women poets
Israeli poets
Writers from London
Academic staff of Ben-Gurion University of the Negev
State University of New York faculty
English women non-fiction writers
British women biographers
Israeli women biographers